is a town located in Inukami District, Shiga Prefecture, Japan. , the town had an estimated population of 7,525 in 2900 households and a population density of 940 persons per km2. Taga developed as a shrine town of Taga Taisha, a major Shinto shrine.

Geography 
Taga is located in eastern Shiga Prefecture, with the eastern part of the town is in the Suzuka Mountains bordering Inabe in Mie Prefecture and Ogaki in Gifu Prefecture. The western part of the town is in the flatlands of the Koto Plains, which extend towards Lake Biwa. The administrative and industrial center of the town is in the west, with the mountainous areas suffering from rural depopulation.The Inukami River flows through the south of the town.

Neighbouring municipalities
Shiga Prefecture
 Maibara
 Hikone
 Kōra
 Aishō
 Higashiōmi
Gifu Prefecture
 Ōgaki
Mie Prefecture
 Inabe

Climate
Taga has a Humid subtropical climate (Köppen Cfa) characterized by warm summers and cool winters with light to no snowfall.

Demographics
Per Japanese census data, the population of Taga has declined over the past 70 years.

History
The area of Taga was part of ancient Ōmi Province, and the name is listed in the ancient Kojiki chronicle. The area was dominated by the local Taga clan from ancient times into the Sengoku period, and the town itself developed as market town in front of the gates of Taga Taisha, a noted Shinto shrine that was favored by Toyotomi Hideyoshi. The Taga clan were dispossessed after the Battle of Sekigahara and the region came under the control of Hikone Domain under the Edo period Tokugawa shogunate. The  village of Taga was established on April 1, 1889 with the creation of the modern municipalities system.Taga merged with the neighboring villages of Seritani and Kyutoku to form the town on Taga on November 3, 1941. The town expanded in 1955 by annexing the villages of Ōtaki and Wakigahata.

Government
Taga has a mayor-council form of government with a directly elected mayor and a unicameral city council of 12 members. Taga, collectively with the other municipalities of Inukami District, contributes one member to the Shiga Prefectural Assembly. In terms of national politics, the city is part of Shiga 2nd district of the lower house of the Diet of Japan.

Economy
Agriculture and forestry has dominated the local economy since ancient times. Manufacturing includes a number of small to medium-sized factories, the largest of which is a bottling plant owned by Kirin Beer and a bakery owned by Fuji Baking Group.

Education
Taga has two public elementary schools and one public middle school operated by the town government. The town does not have a high school.

Transportation

Railway 
 Ohmi Railway – Taga Line

Highways 
  Meishin Expressway

Local attractions
Taga Taisha, a major Shinto shrine
Mount Oike, highest peak in the Suzuka Mountains at 1241 meters
Binmanji Ishibotokedani Necropolis, a National Historic Site

References

External links

 Taga official website 
 Taga Sightseeing Association 

Towns in Shiga Prefecture
Taga, Shiga